Musangsa (Seung Sahn International Zen Center) is an international zen center which follows the teachings of Zen Master Seung Sahn. Musangsa is the Head Temple in Asia of the international zen organization Kwan Um School of Zen. The temple holds 3 months silent retreats Kyolche each in summer and winter every year where monastics and lay practitioners practice together. It also serves as a training temple for monastics of Kwan Um zen lineage and hosts many foreign practitioners of the  same lineage, providing them a chance to practice in Korea. Current main guiding teacher is  Zen Master Dae Bong.

Gallery

References

Buddhist temples in South Korea
Kwan Um School of Zen
Zen temples